Allerton TMD is a railway depot situated in Allerton, Liverpool.

During the days of steam locomotive operation, the shed code was 8H between 1960 and 1963 and 8J between 1963 and 1973. Since 1973, when TOPS was introduced, Allerton's depot code has been AN.

History
During the British Rail era, Allerton depot was responsible for maintaining all of the main line and shunting locomotives which were operating in the Liverpool area, having an allocation of Class 08 diesel shunters and a wheel lathe.

Users

Merseyrail
Until 2006, when a new wheel lathe was installed at Merseyrail's Kirkdale depot, Merseyrail's Class 507 and 508 electric multiple units were regularly sent to Allerton for wheel turning, being transferred via the crossover at Hunts Cross. Other units, including Virgin CrossCountry's Class 220 and 221 diesel electric multiple units (servicing only) and goods wagons and locomotives, have previously been stabled here.

Northern Rail
From March 2011 until 31 March 2016, the depot was operated by Northern Rail.

In 2011, it was announced that Network Rail had purchased the then closed Allerton TMD with the intention of refurbishing and reopening the depot for servicing of Northern Rail's fleet of Class 156 Super Sprinter diesel multiple units and the planned allocation of  units, which were to cascade to Northern Rail for planned electrified services. Previously owned by the English Welsh and Scottish Railway, Allerton TMD re-opened on 10 December 2011. The first Class 319 units entered traffic in March 2015 with the completion of the first phase of the North West Electrification programme.

Arriva Rail North

On 1 April 2016, when the new Northern franchise period commenced, operation of Allerton transferred to Arriva Rail North. The depot retained its allocation of 29 Class 156 DMUs and twenty Class 319/3 EMUs, with an additional twelve Class 319s being allocated to the depot during 2017.

Allerton's allocation of Class 156 units transferred to Newton Heath in 2018.

Northern Trains

On 1 March 2020 the Northern franchise was taken over by Northern Trains as an Operators last choice by the Department for Transport and the operation of Allerton transferred to Northern Trains.

References

Sources
 

Railway depots in England
Rail transport in Liverpool